Baminnahennadige Sheshadrie Priyasad (born 2 December 1991) (Sinhala: ශේෂාද්‍රි ප්‍රියසාද්) is an actress in Sri Lankan cinema and television presenter who appears in television shows.

Personal life
Sheshadri Priyasad was born on 2 December 1991 as the second of the family with three siblings. Her father Dinesh Priyasad is a filmmaker and producer in Sinhala cinema and mother Shirani Priyasad is a housewife. Her elder sister Dinakshie Priyasad is also a popular award winning actress in Sri Lankan cinema, television and stage drama and a television host. Her younger sister Shanudrie Priyasad is also a popular award winning actress in cinema, television as well as a singer. She is a past pupil of Holy Family Convent, Bambalapitiya.

Career
Her maiden cinematic experience came through as a four months old child artist in 1997 film Apaye Thathpara Asu Haradahak directed by her father Dinesh Priyasad. She also worked as a child television host in the children's program Punchi Panchi with her sister Dinakshie, which is telecasted by Sirasa TV. Sheshadri made her first adult main role in the 2011 film Challengers (Yawwanaye Babaru Api).

Filmography

Television

Film

Awards
She won a merit award at 34th Sarasaviya Awards in 2016 for the role Shanuli in 2015 film Zoom.

Bunka Cultural Awards

|-
|| 2016 ||| Zoom || Merit Award || 
|-
|| 2016 ||| Address Na || Best Upcoming Actress ||

References

External links
 Vaseline cream gets boost from teledrama actress
 ශේෂාද්‍රි ප්‍රියසාද් පුංචි දරුවෙකු සමඟ කරළියට
 ප්‍රියසාද් පවුලේ හැංගිලා හිටපු ශේෂාද්‍රි ආයෙත් කරලියට

Living people
Sri Lankan film actresses
1991 births
Alumni of Holy Family Convent, Bambalapitiya